Kenneth Ormsby is a former Canadian ice dancer. Competing with Paulette Doan, he was the 1963 and 1964 Canadian champion and in those years won bronze and silver medals (respectively) at the World Figure Skating Championships.

Ormsby was from Toronto and trained there during his competitive career.  He was also studying for a degree in accounting.

After the 1964 season, Doan and Ormsby turned professional and toured with Ice Follies.  They announced their engagement the day they joined the show.

As of 2010, Kenneth Ormsby is on the coaching staff at the Scarboro Figure Skating Club in Toronto, Ontario.

Results
(with Paulette Doan)

 Doan and Ormsby competed in both the junior and senior events at the 1961 Canadian Championships.

References

Canadian male ice dancers
Living people
Year of birth missing (living people)
Figure skaters from Toronto
World Figure Skating Championships medalists
20th-century Canadian people